John Denver - A Portrait is an album made by Windstar Records and features the music of John Denver.  A similarly named Portrait was released by BMG in 1999. The BMG release was a two-disc set.

John Denver: A Portrait is also the name of a VHS documentary about his life, released in 1994.

Track listing
"Is It Love"
"Rocky Mountain High"
"Two Different Directions"
"For You"
"Calypso"
"Annie's Song"
"Seasons Of The Heart"
"Sweet Surrender"
"Whispering Jessie"
"Shanghai Breezes"
"Sunshine on My Shoulders"
"The Flower That Shattered The Stone"
"Country Girl In Paris"
"Take Me Home"

John Denver compilation albums
1999 compilation albums